Chubanluy-e Olya (also Romanized as Chūbānlūy-e ‘Olyā; also known as Chobānlī, Chūpānlū, Chūpānlū-ye Bālā, and Chūpānlū-ye ‘Olyā) is a village in Lakestan Rural District, in the Central District of Salmas County, West Azerbaijan Province, Iran. At the 2006 census, its population was 170, in 41 families.

References 

Populated places in Salmas County